Maneet Chauhan (born 27 October 1976 in Ludhiana, Punjab) is an Indian American chef and television personality. Previously the Executive Chef of several notable restaurants in Chicago, Nashville, and New York, she is featured as a judge on Chopped on the Food Network. She has appeared on The Next Iron Chef, on The View on ABC, Iron Chef America, the Today show on NBC, and as a judge on the finale of Worst Cooks in America on Food Network. She has also won the 2021 Food Network competition Tournament of Champions.

Chauhan was invited by President Obama and First Lady Michelle Obama for the Annual Easter Egg Roll Hunt 2014 to the White House. She is also an invited member of Indiaspora that hosted 100 influential Indian American leaders as part of its first Forum in September 2012. The three-day Forum events aimed to energize the community and provide a voice with which it articulated collective goals. Chef Chauhan, a Culinary Institute of America alumna, delivered the keynote for the associate degree commencement on the college's Hyde Park campus and also received a recognition of "Distinguished Service to the Foodservice and Hospitality Industry" as the Ambassador of the Culinary Institute of America.

Career 
Chauhan was born into a Sikh household. She began her culinary career at the Manipal University's WelcomGroup Graduate School of Hotel Administration, Manipal, India, where she graduated at the top of her class earning a bachelor's degree in Hotel Management. She then attended the Culinary Institute of America in Hyde Park, New York and graduated sweeping all of the awards of her class. As an apprentice chef, she worked in India with the Oberoi Group, Taj Group, Welcome Group and Sheraton Group.

Right after graduation in 2000 she was hired as management for a startup restaurant in Cherry Hill, New Jersey, where she headed a team and expanded the restaurant's capacity from 70 seats to 140 seats. In 2003, at the age of 27, she became the opening executive chef of Vermilion in Chicago, Illinois, earning her 3-Stars from The Chicago Tribune. In 2007, she moved to NYC to open At Vermilion where she was nominated as the 'Best Import to New York' by Time Out Magazine. Her style is described as "global fusion" with roots in Indian cuisine.

Books 
She wrote her first cookbook, Flavors of My World: A Culinary Tour Through 25 Countries, published by Favorite Recipes Press, an imprint of Nashville-based Southwestern Publishing Group. She conducted a 21-city bus tour across the U.S. to promote the book and was noted as one of the Cookbooks of the Year.
Her other book (electronic, publisher: Alta Editions), authored with Katy Sparks, Alex Raij, Rita Sodi and Kathleen Squires, called The Journey, won the award from International Association of Culinary Professionals 2014. Her most recent cookbook Chaat, co-authored with Jody Eddy, was released in October 2020 and includes over eighty Indian recipes with a focus on street food and local cuisine.

Restaurant 
Chauhan opened her first restaurant in Nashville, Tennessee. It is called "Chauhan Ale and Masala House". The restaurant, which accommodates 150, opened in August 2014.

Charity work 
Maneet Chauhan has participated in fundraisers to benefit underprivileged children in India and the typhoon relief efforts in the Philippines.

See also 
 Chopped (TV series)

References

External links 
 

1976 births
Food Network chefs
Indian emigrants to the United States
Indian television chefs
Living people
People from Ranchi
American women journalists
American writers of Indian descent
American people of Indian descent
American businesspeople
Businesspeople from Jharkhand
Culinary Institute of America Hyde Park alumni
American women chefs
Businesswomen from Jharkhand
21st-century American women